ComPAN 8 is an 8-bit Polish microcomputer produced in the 1980s at the MERA-ELZAB factory in Zabrze, Poland. ComPAN 8 was designed at the Institute of Industry Automation Systems PAN in Gliwice.

Technical description

Processor: 8080A or 8085 2 MHz
Interrupt controller: 8 levels
Address bus: extended by 5 additional lines (A16..AA20), max. 2 MB of memory
RAM: 64 kB
ROM: 8 kB 
Keyboard: 83 keys MERA 7926M with numerical part
Floppy disk controller: 8” or 5,25”
Interfaces: 2 x RS-232C, parallel port, printer interface circuit
Monochromatic display, divided into 2 (or 3) windows:
system window: 4 lines, 80 characters on the bottom of the screen
workspace window:
24x80 characters – text mode
30x80 Characters – graphical-text mode
288x240 pixels – graphical mode
additional system window (optional): 8 lines with 30 characters on the top of screen

Software

Operation system:
CP/M (more popular)
ISIS-II
programming languages
 macroassembler
 Pascal
 Fortran
 PL/M (ISIS-II)

References

External links
 Old computers magazine (polish)

Microcomputers
Science and technology in Poland